The National Salt Satyagraha Memorial or Dandi Memorial is a memorial in Dandi, Gujarat, India, that honors the activists and participants of the Salt Satyagraha, an act of nonviolent civil disobedience in colonial India which was led by Mahatma Gandhi in 1930.

History

The project to develop the National Salt Satyagrah Memorial was conceived and advised by the High Level Dandi Memorial Committee (HLDMC) and was endorsed by the Ministry of Culture, Government of India. The IIT Bombay provided services as a Design Coordination Agency. The memorial was inaugurated on 30 January 2019, the death anniversary of Mahatma Gandhi, by Indian Prime Minister Narendra Modi.

Features

Monument

The monument is a  steel frame in "A" shape, symbolizing two hands. In order to protect it from sea coast weather, it is made up of a non-corroding material. At the apex of the monument, there is a  glass cube representing the salt crystal. The cube is illuminated by laser lights at night which creates the illusion of a pyramid. In 2014, the statue was cast in sixty separate pieces at Mumbai, assembled into one statue and transported to Dandi, taking more than two years to complete. It is sculpted by Sadashiv Sathe.

Depiction of march

To the left of the main memorial there is a life sized statue of Gandhi with 78 volunteers. These statues are made of bronze. An Open Call for sculptors was made and 40 sculptors were selected from India, Austria, Bulgaria, Burma, Japan, Sri Lanka, Tibet, UK and United States. Each sculptor created two sculptures each. After the clay sculptures had been completed, molds and fiber casts were made and the sculptures were cast in silicon-bronze alloy by Studio Sukriti in Jaipur.

Artificial lake

An artificial lake was created to symbolize the seashore aspect of the Salt Satyagraha. The lake is a non-permeable, geotextile based lake which is sealed from the bottom and top to prevent salt infiltration. The lake is filled with harvested rainwater which is treated to produce sparkling clear water.

Solar trees

In order to reinstate the virtue of Self-sufficiency reinforced by Gandhi in the Freedom Struggle, the memorial is made self-sufficient for its energy needs. To achieve this 40 Solar Trees are installed. This makes this memorial a net zero-energy project. The energy produced during the day is exported to the electricity grid and during the night, the energy required is imported back from the grid. This system avoids need to install and maintain expensive batteries.

Solar salt-making pans
In order to engage the visitors, solar salt making pans are installed. As a memento of a visit to the memorial visitors are allowed to take a pinch of salt back home. The activity is aimed at celebrating the strategic brilliance of the Mahatma, who used the powerful metaphor of salt to lead towards independence.

Narrative murals

In all there are 22 narrative murals. The initial conceptualization for the murals was done at IIT Bombay and Clayfingers Pottery at Urakam, Kerala. After conceptualization at IIT Bombay and Clayfingers Pottery at Urakam, Kerala, the murals were cast in clay by Jawaharlal Nehru Architecture and Fine Arts University and later they were cast in bronze by studio Sukriti. The details of the Murals are as below:

Miscellaneous
On the wall of one of the structure Gandhi's quote dated 5 April 1930 which was written at Dandi, is superscribed in his handwriting which reads:

Adjacent memorials

Saifee Villa and Prarthana Mandir

During the march, Gandhi had spent a night of 5 April 1930 at Saifee Villa. It was owned by Syedna Taher Saifuddin, 51st religious head of the Dawoodi Bohra community. In 1961, he requested Prime Minister Jawaharlal Nehru to dedicate this villa to the nation as part of the national heritage.

Since 1964, the villa has been maintained by the Government of Gujarat. In 2016, the Vadodara Circle of Archaeological Survey of India partially restored the Saifee Villa and Prarthana Mandir.

Gallery

See also
 Salt March

References

Monuments and memorials in Gujarat
2019 establishments in Gujarat
Tourist attractions in Gujarat
Navsari district
Memorials to Mahatma Gandhi
2019 sculptures